Charles Barker (5 July 1847 – 29 November 1891) was an English cricketer. He played in two first-class matches in New Zealand for Canterbury in 1873/74.

See also
 List of Canterbury representative cricketers

References

External links
 

1847 births
1891 deaths
English cricketers
Canterbury cricketers
Sportspeople from Hereford